Marcos Antonio Rojas Concha (born 2 June 1995) is a Peruvian weightlifter. In 2021, he competed in the men's 61 kg event at the 2020 Summer Olympics in Tokyo, Japan.

He competed in the men's 56 kg at the 2017 World Weightlifting Championships held in Anaheim, United States. In 2018, he won the bronze medal in the men's 56 kg event at the 2018 South American Games held in Cochabamba, Bolivia.

In 2019, he finished in 7th place in the men's 61 kg event at the Pan American Games held in Lima, Peru. A few months later, he also competed in the men's 61 kg event at the 2019 World Weightlifting Championships held in Pattaya, Thailand.

References

External links 
 

Living people
1995 births
Peruvian male weightlifters
South American Games bronze medalists for Peru
South American Games medalists in weightlifting
Competitors at the 2018 South American Games
Weightlifters at the 2019 Pan American Games
Pan American Games competitors for Peru
Olympic weightlifters of Peru
Weightlifters at the 2020 Summer Olympics
People from San Martín Region
21st-century Peruvian people